Suryaa may refer to:

Suryaa (film), 2008 Tamil film
Suryaa (newspaper), Telugu-language newspaper headquartered in Hyderabad

See also
Suryaa: An Awakening, 1989 film directed by Esmayeel Shroff
Surya (disambiguation)